Alister De Bellotte is a Grenadian professional football manager.

Career
In 2004, he coached the Grenada national football team. In 2011, he worked as manager of the Grenada U23 team. In September 2012 he was again coach of the Grenada team.

References

External links
Profile at Sccerway.com
Profile at Soccerpunter.com

Year of birth missing (living people)
Living people
Grenadian football managers
Grenada national football team managers
Place of birth missing (living people)